Oszkár Ács (born 1969) is a musician, best known as the bass guitarist of Amber Smith.

Early life and personal life
Ács was born in Szeged, Hungary. He is the co-founder of Időrablók. He joined Amber Smith in 2002. He left the band in 2012 due to his deteriorating illness.

Amber Smith

Ács also wrote some songs for Amber Smith's eponymous record (Amber Smith).

In January 2013, Ács left the band. Imre Poniklo said that Ács was a creative member of the band and he thought of disbanding Amber Smith after the departure of Ács.

In an interview with Recorder Blog, Ács said that Morrissey was his idol when he was invited to analyse Morrissey's World Peace Is None of Your Business release.

On 16 October 2015, Ács played the bass on some songs at the 15th anniversary of Amber Smith in Budapest.

The Twist
In 2010 Ács founded the Hungarian indie band, The Twist, with members of Heaven Street Seven.

Discography
With Amber Smith:
Albums
 My Little Servant (2003)
 rePRINT (2006)
 Introspective (2008)
 Amber Smith (2012)

Instruments

Guitars
 Danelectro DC Bass
 Silvertone 1478 Reissue

Effect pedals
Electro-Harmonix Bass Micro Synthesizer

Amplifiers
Ampeg B2 combo
Fender Super Champ X2

See also
Budapest indie music scene
Amber Smith
Imre Poniklo

References

External links
 Ács on Discogs

1969 births
Living people
Hungarian indie rock musicians
People from Szeged